Vasily Zhurnevich (born 21 February 1995) is a Belarusian professional football player currently playing for Slonim-2017 on loan from Neman Grodno.

References

External links

1995 births
Living people
Belarusian footballers
Association football forwards
Belarusian expatriate footballers
Expatriate footballers in Poland
FC Neman Grodno players
FC Lida players
FC Slonim-2017 players
FC Torpedo-BelAZ Zhodino players
FC Dynamo Brest players